Gnana Shekar V. S. (born June 1, 1979) is an Indian cinematographer and painter. He marked his beginning with his student film titled Tetris which was an official selection at Cinéfondation, Cannes Film Festival. First gained critical recognition for his debut as an independent cinematographer with the film Vedam (2010). His work is noted for its realistic approach. In 2017 his cinematography for Gautamiputra Satakarni received accolades and rave reviews for his unique way of painting the canvas of the silver screen using natural flame.

Early life and education

Gnana Shekar's education was an irony, Being the son of a teacher he never had an experience of schooling. He was a curious kid who picked up on his father's collection of literature. At early life, his imagination took a swirl when he stumbled upon an Illustrated magazine which evoked a sense of visualization in him.

As a fine arts student, he was influenced by great masters like Vincent Van Gogh and Niko Pirosmani which inspired him to create some intense spiritual Art works in which he marries a Modernist sense of Perspective with an authentic form. Though his first love was painting, later during the course, he wanted to mould his skill into photography.

Art career

Painting the screen apart, Gnana Shekar has another love – painting the canvas. Blessed with a flair for the fine arts, the cinematographer showcased a collection of his works at Park Hyatt Hyderabad on 18 April 2015 and attended by the Art Lovers in the city.

Gnana will be exhibiting a new series of his paintings, on faces, in Georgia, where his favourite filmmaker Sergei Parajanov and painter Niko Pirosmani are from.

Gnana Shekar fond of acrylic colours. never uses a paint brush to paint. he paints with a thumb, it makes him feel more connected. He has also begun using computer generated graphic art, using geometric shapes to create a reflection of life.

Filmography

Short films and documentaries

Feature films

References

External links 
 
 

1979 births
Living people
Telugu film cinematographers
Tamil film cinematographers